The Stamford Main Post Office, also known as US Post Office–Stamford Main, is a historic post office building at 421 Atlantic Street in Stamford, Connecticut.  The building, built in 1916 is prominent sited in downtown Stamford, being in view of the Connecticut Turnpike, and it is unusual for its Italianate style of architecture.  It was listed on the National Register of Historic Places in 1985.

 The National Trust for Historic Preservation cited the site as one of ten historic sites saved in 2013.

Gallery

See also 
National Register of Historic Places listings in Stamford, Connecticut
List of United States post offices

References 
  Case 3:13-cv-01406-JBA Document 123 Filed 08/13/14 Page 1 of 11
___
 THE NATIONAL POST OFFICE COLLABORATE, et al. Plaintiffs, v. PATRICK R. DONAHOE, et al. Defendants. 
Case No. 3:13CV01406 (JBA)

External links 

Government buildings completed in 1916
Buildings and structures in Stamford, Connecticut
Stamford
Historic American Buildings Survey in Connecticut
Mediterranean Revival architecture in the United States
National Register of Historic Places in Fairfield County, Connecticut